This list includes songs from the Guitar Praise video game, the Expansion Pack 1 for this game, the Guitar Praise: Stryper expansion pack and online only songs.

Notes

Guitar Praise